Romuald Figuier (born in Saint-Pol-de-Léon, Finistère, Brittany, on 9 May 1938), also known mononymously as Romuald, is a French singer.

He represented  in the 1964 Eurovision Song Contest with "Où sont-elles passées" and finished 3rd.

In 1968, Romuald represented Andorra at the III International Song Festival held at the Maracanazinho Stadium in Rio de Janeiro, Brazil. He finished fifth with the song "Le bruit des vagues" (S. Lebrail/P. Sevran, Romuald). The following year, he represented the same country in the same festival and finished fifth again with the song "Tous les printemps du monde" (S. Lebrail/P. Sevran, Romuald).

His third attempt, representing Monaco again, in the 1974 Eurovision Song Contest with "Celui qui reste et celui qui s'en va", was 4th.

Romuald represented Luxembourg in the VIII International Song Festival in Sopot, Poland, in August 1968, reaching third place in international competition with the theme "Rien n'a changé".

In February 1973, Romuald represented France with "Laisse-moi le temps" in the XIV International Song Festival in Viña del Mar, Chile, where he finished 2nd and got the prize for the Best Singer. Some months later, Paul Anka bought the rights of the song from the authors (/Caravelli), and along with Sammy Cahn composed lyrics in English, giving it to Frank Sinatra, who made it famous all over the world as "Let me Try Again" (from Ol' Blue Eyes Is Back, Reprise Records, October 1973).

External links

References

1941 births
Living people
People from Finistère
French male singers
Eurovision Song Contest entrants for Monaco
Eurovision Song Contest entrants for Luxembourg
Eurovision Song Contest entrants of 1964
Eurovision Song Contest entrants of 1969
Eurovision Song Contest entrants of 1974